Ronald Allen (September 13, 1947 – August 10, 2010) was an African-American poet and playwright who described his work as a "concert of language."  The Detroit native employed intuitive configurations of language (i.e., image, trope, and metaphor) to invent new meaning and structures for the exploration and expression of language arts, including poetry and theater.

Like fellow Detroit playwright Ron Milner, Allen's ear for the use of Afro-American language, particularly in Detroit, was keen.  Known for his experiments with poetic verse, character, theme and structure, Allen created centers of language experiences and rhythm through his writing.

Artistic philosophy

In a 2009 interview, Ron Allen described his artistic philosophy:

 “My work is an exploration and expression of the abstract and physical nature of reality.  Language or written text is the force that poetically drives the plot, character, and direction of my work.   I use metaphor and trope to create landscapes of defamilarized environments and conditions that affect human consciousness.

 “I attempt to walk the radical edge of meaning and theatricality in an assault on conditioned response in behavior and thinking in our culture.  I am a critic of the norms that restrict innovation and restrict the search for freedom of ideas as a human imperative.

 “My characters are social paradigms and objectified patterns of historical class and power.  The point is the search for truth as undefined as that may be, but truth as realization on the scale of impersonal triumph and the struggle of more questions.

 “The issue of race which I define as the ongoing muck of American culture is the center of much of my work.  I strive to explore what it means to be black in an upside-down world – a world that makes the struggle for identity and power a radical act.”

Career

He began his theatrical career in Detroit in 1997, when he formed his acting company “Thick Knot Rhythm Ensemble”. This company became the medium for the production of 13 plays he wrote and produced, including Last Church of the Twentieth Century, Aborigional Treatment Center , Twenty Plays in Twenty Minutes, Dreaming the Reality Room Yellow, WHAM!, The Tibetan Book of the Dead, Relative Energy Sack Theory Museum, and The Heidelberg Project: Squatting in the Circle of the Elder Mind, a play loosely based on the life of Tyree Guyton and the struggle to create his Heidelberg Project.

After his move to Los Angeles, California in 2007, Allen wrote three more plays: Swallow the Sun, My Eyes Are the Cage in My Head (produced in 2008 by the Los Angeles Poverty Department Theater Company), and The Hieroglyph of the Cockatoo.  His play Eye Mouth Graffiti Body Shop, originally performed at The Metropolitan Center for Creative Arts in Detroit in 2001,  was produced in 2007 by the Theatre of N.O.T.E. He also performed with his Los Angeles-based jazz and poetry band Code Zero.

Allen published four books of critically acclaimed poetry, including I Want My Body Back  and Neon Jawbone Riot.  He released a book of poetry in 2008 titled The Inkblot Theory. He was founder and director of Weightless Language Press.  He taught poetry and theater for 13 years in the drug recovery community in Detroit. He also taught poetry and meditation in an assisted-living facility in Inglewood, California.

Ron Allen died August 10, 2010, in Los Angeles.

References

External links 
 The Aboriginal Treatment Center
 Fried Poetry
 Zeitgeist Detroit

African-American poets
Writers from Michigan
1947 births
2010 deaths
African-American dramatists and playwrights
American male poets
American male dramatists and playwrights
20th-century American poets
20th-century American dramatists and playwrights
20th-century American male writers
20th-century African-American writers
21st-century African-American people
African-American male writers